The World is Big and Salvation Lurks Around the Corner is a 2008 Bulgarian drama-road film, co-produced with Slovenia, Germany and Hungary. Its original Bulgarian title is Светът е голям и спасение дебне отвсякъде (transliterated as Svetat e golyam i spasenie debne otvsyakade), literally meaning The World is Big and Salvation Prowls on All Sides. (correct - "... is Lurking from Everywhere.") 

The film is directed by Stefan Komandarev and stars Miki Manojlović, Carlo Ljubek, Hristo Mutafchiev and Ana Papadopulu. It is based on the eponymous autobiographic novel by Bulgarian-German writer Ilija Trojanow.

The film has received generally favorable reviews from film critics and audiences around the world, having received more than 20 festival awards. On January 20, 2010 it was revealed that the film had been selected among the nine films that will advance to the next round of voting in the Foreign Language Film category for the 82nd Academy Awards.

Plot
In a small Bulgarian provincial town during the 1980s, factory worker Vasil 'Vasko' Georgiev (Hristo Mutafchiev) has problems with the local Communist Party agent (Nikolai Urumov) who wants Vasko to monitor and report on the activities of his father-in-law, Bai Dan (Miki Manojlović).  Bai Dan is the local "King of Backgammon" and is accused by the local authorities of conducting an illegal workshop in which he repairs bicycles and manufactures backgammon sets. Facing a moral dilemma, Vasko decides to emigrate beyond the Iron Curtain to Western Europe with his wife Yana (Ana Papadopulu) and his son Aleksander 'Sashko' (played as a child by Blagovest Mutafchiev). The family succeeds in crossing the border to Italy but face the prospect of lengthy detention in a bleak refugee camp until Vasko is able to pay for them to be smuggled into Germany.

The opening sequences jump abruptly from the birth of Sashko to the 2007 autobahn car accident in which his parents are killed on their way back to Bulgaria for the first time since their emigration. Sashko (played as an adult by Carlo Ljubek) is taken to a hospital with amnesia. His grandfather Bai Dan decides to go to Germany and try to help Sashko restore his past. He starts teaching him to play backgammon. After refusing to play, Sashko is forced by his grandfather to leave the hospital and to start a journey with him on a tandem bicycle—a journey back to Bulgaria, to Sashko's past, and to romance and prospects of a happier future.

Cast

Awards
The film has received more than 20 awards at festivals around the world:

2009
  Saturno International Film Festival - Saturno d’Oro for Best Film, Best Actor Award for Miki Manojlović
  Minsk International Film Festival - Golden Listopad for Best Film
  Festival of European Cinema - Audience Award
  Benalmadena International Film Festival - Best Film Award, Jury Award
  Festroia International Film Festival - Best Director Award, SIGNIS Award, Audience Award
  Duress International Film Festival - Best Director Award
  Sevastopol Film Festival - Best Actor Award for Miki Manojlović
  Taipei International Film Festival - Audience Award
  Almaty International Film Festival - Best Actor Award for Miki Manojlović
  Vilnius International Film Festival - Grand Prix for Best Film, Special Jury Award for Acting to Miki Manojlović

2008
  Black Nights International Film Festival - Jury Special Mention, ‘Don Quijote Award’ of the International Association of the Film Clubs
  Film and the City Film Festival - Best Film Award
  Zurich International Film Festival - Audience Award
  Golden Rose National Feature Film Festival - Best Screenplay, Best Cinematographer
  Warsaw International Film Festival - Jury Special Award
  Bergen International Film Festival - Main Jury Award „Cinema Extraordinaire”
  Sofia International Film Festival - Best Bulgarian Film, Audience Award

References

External links 
 
 
 

2000s Bulgarian-language films
2000s German-language films
2000s Italian-language films
Slovene-language films
2008 multilingual films
2008 films
Films shot in Bulgaria
Bulgarian drama films
2000s drama road movies
Bulgarian multilingual films